Convict fish may refer to:

Pholidichthys leucotaenia, a sea-dwelling species
Convict cichlid
Archosargus probatocephalus, a species of fish native to the Atlantic Ocean also known as the convict fish